Danielle Dube (born 20 February 1987 in Halifax, Nova Scotia) is a Canadian sports sailor. At the 2012 Summer Olympics, she competed in the Women's Laser Radial class, finishing in 27th place.

References

1987 births
Canadian female sailors (sport)
Living people
Olympic sailors of Canada
Sportspeople from Halifax, Nova Scotia
Sailors at the 2012 Summer Olympics – Laser Radial